Francis Nelson may refer to:
Francis Nelson (ice hockey, born 1859) (1859–1932), Canadian ice hockey administrator
Francis Nelson (ice hockey, born 1910) (1910–1973), American ice hockey player at the Winter Olympics
Francis Augustus Nelson (1878–1950), architect from Montclair, New Jersey
Francis Nelson (American football), List of Baylor Bears in the NFL draft
Francis Nelson (judge), served 1 February 1968–14 June 1977 List of Judges of the Supreme Court of Victoria

See also
Frances Nelson (1761–1831), wife of Horatio Nelson
Frances Nelson (actress) (1892–1975), American silent film actress
Frank Nelson (disambiguation)